Sheldon Baird Vance (January 18, 1917 – November 12, 1995), born in Crookston, Minnesota, was the U.S. Ambassador to Zaire from May 27, 1969 through March 26, 1974. During his tenure, he developed a close relationship with President Mobutu Sese Seko, and became an ardent and vocal supporter of the President; he also supported Mobutu's aspirations for regional leadership and advocated foreign investment in Zaire and "strongly recommended" that the U.S. sell M-16s to Mobutu. According to diplomats stationed in Zaire at the time, Vance "would not permit negative analyses of the Mobutu regime to be transmitted to Washington." Vance's support of Mobutu continued even after he left Zaire; shortly after retiring from the State Department, he joined a law firm representing the Zairian government. He was also briefly sent back to Zaire after his successor, Deane Hinton (who did not get along with Mobutu) was declared persona non grata, to patch up the American-Zairian relationship, which had soured considerably during Hinton's tenure.

Life after Zaire
Vance served as senior adviser to the secretary of state, coordinator for international narcotics matters, and executive director of the President's Cabinet Committee on International Narcotics Control (1974–1977). After retiring from the Foreign Service in 1977, he practiced international law in the Washington, D.C. law firm of Vance, Joyce, Carbaugh and Fields (1977–1989). In later years, the Vances lived in Chevy Chase, Maryland. Vance died in Bethesda, Maryland in 1995 at the age of 78.

Family life
His parents were Erskine Ward and Helen (Baird) Vance. He married Jean Chambers on December 28, 1939; they had two sons, Robert Clarke and Stephen Baird.

Education
High School: Austin High School, Austin, MN (1935)
University: BA, Carleton College (1939)
Law School: Harvard University (1942)

Notable assignments
 US Official Cabinet Committee, International Narcotics Control (1974–77)
 US Ambassador to Zaire (1969–74)
 US Ambassador to Chad (1967–69)
 US Official Senior Foreign Service Inspector (1966–67)
 US Official Deputy Chief of Mission, US Embassy, Ethiopia (1962–66)
 US Official Director, Office of Central African Affairs (1961–62)
 US Official Bureau of Africa, Middle East, and South Asia (1958–60)
 US Official First Secretary, US Embassy, Brussels (1954–58)
 US Official Belgium-Luxembourg Desk Officer, Washington (1952–54)
 US Official Desk Officer, Switzerland (1951–52)
 US Official Consul, US Embassy, Martinique (1949–51)
 US Official Vice Consul, Nice and Monaco (1946–49)
 US Official Economic Analyst, US Embassy, Rio de Janeiro (1942–46)

Notes

References
 An Inventory of the Sheldon and Jean Vance Papers at the Minnesota Historical Society

1917 births
1995 deaths
People from Crookston, Minnesota
Ambassadors of the United States to the Democratic Republic of the Congo
Ambassadors of the United States to Chad
Cold War diplomats
Carleton College alumni
Harvard Law School alumni
United States Foreign Service personnel